Deudorix subguttata is a butterfly in the family Lycaenidae. It was described by Henry John Elwes in 1893. It is found in the Indomalayan realm.

Subspecies
Deudorix subguttata subguttata (Burma)
Deudorix subguttata malaya (Pendlebury & Corbet, 1933) (Peninsular Malaysia, Singapore, possibly Sumatra)

References

External links
Deudorix at Markku Savela's Lepidoptera and Some Other Life Forms

Deudorix
Butterflies described in 1893